In additive combinatorics, Freiman's theorem is a central result which indicates the approximate structure of sets whose sumset is small. It roughly states that if  is small, then  can be contained in a small generalized arithmetic progression.

Statement

Examples
For a finite set  of integers, it is always true that

with equality precisely when  is an arithmetic progression.

More generally, suppose  is a subset of a finite proper generalized arithmetic progression  of dimension  such that  for some real . Then , so that

History of Freiman's theorem
This result is due to Gregory Freiman (1964, 1966).  Much interest in it, and applications, stemmed from a new proof by Imre Z. Ruzsa (1994).  Mei-Chu Chang proved new polynomial estimates for the size of arithmetic progressions arising in the theorem in 2002. The current best bounds were provided by Tom Sanders.

Tools used in the proof
The proof presented here follows the proof in Yufei Zhao's lecture notes.

Plünnecke-Ruzsa inequality

Ruzsa covering lemma
The Ruzsa covering lemma states the following:

Let  and  be finite subsets of an abelian group with  nonempty, and let  be a positive real number.

This lemma provides a bound on how many copies of  one needs to cover , hence the name. The proof is essentially a greedy algorithm:

Then , and also , so . Thus , so .

Freiman homomorphisms and the Ruzsa modeling lemma
A map  is a Freiman -homomorphism if

whenever  for any .

If  is a Freiman -homomorphism, then  is a Freiman -homomorphism for any positive integer  such that .

Then the Ruzsa modeling lemma states the following:

Let  be a finite set of integers, and let  be a positive integer. Let  be a positive integer such that .

For nonzero , let  be the multiplication by  map, which is a Freiman -isomorphism. Let  be the image . The result follows after composing this map with the earlier Freiman -isomorphism.

Bohr sets and Bogolyubov's lemma
Though Freiman's theorem applies to sets of integers, the Ruzsa modeling lemma allows one to model sets of integers as subsets of finite cyclic groups. So it is useful to first work in the setting of a finite field, and then generalize results to the integers. The following lemma was proved by Bogolyubov:

Let  and let .

Generalizing this lemma to arbitrary cyclic groups requires an analogous notion to “subspace”: that of the Bohr set. Let  be a subset of  where  is a prime. The Bohr set of dimension  and width  is 

The following lemma generalizes Bogolyubov's lemma:

Then  contains a Bohr set of dimension at most  and width .

The proof of the lemma involves Fourier-analytic methods. The following proposition relates Bohr sets back to generalized arithmetic progressions, eventually leading to the proof of Freiman's theorem.

Then  contains a proper generalized arithmetic progression of dimension at most  and size at least .

The proof of this proposition uses Minkowski's theorem, a fundamental result in geometry of numbers.

Proof
By the Plünnecke-Ruzsa inequality, . By Bertrand's postulate, there exists a prime  such that .

By the generalization of Bogolyubov's lemma,  contains a proper generalized arithmetic progression of dimension  at most  and size at least .

But , since . Thus 

Then  is contained in a generalized arithmetic progression of dimension  and size at most , completing the proof.

Generalizations
A result due to Ben Green and Imre Ruzsa generalized Freiman's theorem to arbitrary abelian groups. They used an analogous notion to generalized arithmetic progressions, which they called coset progressions. Green and Ruzsa showed the following:

Let  be a finite set in an abelian group  such that .

Terence Tao (2010) also generalized Freiman's theorem to solvable groups of bounded derived length.

Extending Freiman’s theorem to an arbitrary nonabelian group is still open.

See also
Markov spectrum
Plünnecke-Ruzsa inequality
Kneser's theorem (combinatorics)

References

Further reading
 

Sumsets
Theorems in number theory